Álvaro Portilla Suárez (born 28 April 1986) is a Spanish footballer who plays for CD Móstoles URJC as a left midfielder.

Club career
Portilla was born in Madrid. With the exception of a few months in the Superleague Greece with Aris Thessaloniki FC, he spent his entire career in the Spanish lower leagues. He finished his development at local club Atlético Madrid, but never appeared in any competitive matches with the first team.

In the 2015–16 season, Portilla scored a career-best 12 goals for CF Rayo Majadahonda, who finished 14th in their Segunda División B group.

References

External links

1986 births
Living people
Footballers from Madrid
Spanish footballers
Association football midfielders
Segunda División B players
Tercera División players
Atlético Madrid C players
Atlético Madrid B players
CF Rayo Majadahonda players
UD San Sebastián de los Reyes players
RSD Alcalá players
Internacional de Madrid players
CF Fuenlabrada footballers
CD Paracuellos Antamira players
CD Móstoles URJC players
Super League Greece players
Aris Thessaloniki F.C. players
Spanish expatriate footballers
Expatriate footballers in Greece
Spanish expatriate sportspeople in Greece